Kate Eckhardt (born 29 October 1997) is an Australian slalom canoeist who has competed at the international level since 2013.

She won a bronze medal in the K1 team event at the 2017 ICF Canoe Slalom World Championships in Pau.

She is currently studying a Bachelor of Health Sciences at Deakin University.

References

Australian female canoeists
Living people
1997 births
Medalists at the ICF Canoe Slalom World Championships